A chromosphere ("sphere of color") is the second layer of a star's atmosphere, located above the photosphere and below the solar transition region and corona. The term usually refers to the Sun's chromosphere, but not exclusively.  

It possesses a homogeneous layer at the boundary with the photosphere. Hair-like jets of plasma, called spicules, rise from this homogeneous region and through the chromosphere, extending up to  into the corona above.

The chromosphere has a characteristic red color due to electromagnetic emissions in the Hα spectral line. Information about the chromosphere is primarily obtained by analysis of its emitted electromagnetic radiation. 

Chromospheres have also been observed on stars other than the Sun.  On large stars, chromospheres sometimes make up a significant proportion of the entire star. For example, the chromosphere of supergiant star Antares has been found to be about 2.5 times larger in thickness than the star's radius.

Physical properties

The density of the chromosphere is 10−4 times that of the underlying photosphere and 10−8 times that of the Earth's atmosphere at sea level. This makes the chromosphere normally invisible and it can be seen only during a total eclipse, where its reddish colour is revealed. The colour hues are anywhere between pink and red. Without special equipment, the chromosphere cannot normally be seen due to the overwhelming brightness of the photosphere.

The chromosphere's spectrum is dominated by emission lines.

Chromospheric phenomena

Many different phenomena can be observed in chromospheres.

Plage

A plage is a particularly bright region within stellar chromospheres, which are often associated with magnetic activity.

Spicules

The most commonly identified feature in the solar chromosphere are spicules. Spicules rise to the top of the chromosphere and then sink back down again over the course of about 10 minutes.

Oscillations
Oscillations of the radial component of the plasma velocity are typical of the high chromosphere. The photospheric granulation pattern usually has no oscillations above ; however, higher frequency waves (or a  period) were detected in the solar atmosphere (at temperatures typical of the transition region and corona) by TRACE.

Chromospheric loops

Plasma loops can be seen at the border of the solar disk in the chromosphere. They are different from solar prominences because they are concentric arches with maximum temperature of the order  (too low to be considered coronal features). These cool-temperature loops show an intense variability: they appear and disappear in some UV lines in a time less than an hour, or they rapidly expand in 10–20 minutes. Foukal studied these cool loops in detail from the observations taken with the EUV spectrometer on Skylab in 1976. When the plasma temperature of these loops becomes coronal (above ), these features appear more stable and evolve over longer times.

Chromospheric network
Images taken in typical chromospheric lines show the presence of brighter cells, usually referred to as the network, while the surrounding darker regions are named internetwork. They look similar to granules commonly observed on the photosphere due to the heat convection.

Stellar chromospheres
Chromospheres are present on almost all luminous stars other than white dwarfs. They are most prominent and magnetically active on lower-main sequence stars, on brown dwarfs of F and later spectral types, and on giant and subgiant stars.

A spectroscopic measure of chromospheric activity on other stars is the Mount Wilson S-index.

See also
Orders of magnitude (density)
Moreton wave

References

External links
 Animated explanation of the Chromosphere (and Transition Region)   (University of South Wales).
 Animated explanation of the temperature of the Chromosphere (and Transition Region) (University of South Wales).

Sun